Mlap, or Kwansu (obsolete), is a Papuan language of Indonesia. It is spoken just to the west of Lake Sentani.

References

Nimboran languages
Languages of western New Guinea